The  or ITKF is the international governing body for Traditional Karate. This organisation was founded by Hidetaka Nishiyama. In the early 1990s, Nishiyama's refusal to align his ITKF organization with the World Union of Karate-Do Organizations (WUKO) caused the International Olympic Committee to suspend its recognition of WUKO as amateur karate's international governing body. 
According to the IOC decision 101 from 1993 the ITKF and WUKO had been due to merge and form a unified karate organization under the IOC suggested name of WKF. The IOC further indicated its intention to recognize the merged WKF should ITKF and WUKO successfully fulfill the IOC 101 decision guidelines, but this did not eventuate. The WUKO eventually became the World Union of Karate-Do Federations in late 2008.

ITKF Officials
Chairman: Prof. Gilberto Gaertner
Board of Directors: Gilberto Gaertner, Antonio Walger, Roman Pavlovic
General Secretary: Luiz Alberto Küster
Treasurer: Rui Francisco Martins Marçal
Director General: Sadiomar Santos
Technical Committee: Gilberto Gaertner, Eligio Contareli, Justo Gomez 
Communications & Marketing Committee: Eyal Nir, Roman Pavlovic, Ibrahim Al-Bakr, Leonardo Neves Berg do Prado,
 Innovation and Technology Committee: Vinícius Sant’Anna Pinto, Joarez Evangelista Franco Junior, Rafael Gustavo Gaertner, Sheriff Abuel Enein,

National federations
The ITKF has national clubs in more than 60 countries.

References

External links

1974 establishments in the United States
Sports organizations established in 1974
Karate organizations
Karate